Neoclassical architecture appeared in Belgium during the period of Austrian occupation in the mid-18th century and enjoyed considerable longevity in the country, surviving through periods of French and Dutch occupation, and the birth of Independent Belgium, surviving well into the 20th century.

Origins of neoclassical architecture
Neoclassicism in architecture was the result of renewed interest in the architectural forms of Greco-Roman antiquity discovered in the excavation of sites such as Pompeii and Herculaneum in the 18th century.

Its spread in Europe was driven by:
 the writings of Johann Joachim Winckelmann, who can be regarded as the founder of art history and archaeology as modern disciplines;
 the practice of Grand Tour, a trip made by young men of the upper classes of European society, which had the effect of bringing together northern European high society together with ancient art;
 visits to Italy by many young artists and architects.

Neoclassicism in the Austrian Netherlands
Growth of the neoclassical style in the Austrian Netherlands took place from 1759 during the reign of the Empress Maria Theresa of Austria and the governorship of her brother-in-law Charles Alexander of Lorraine.

The growth of the style was aided by various elements including:

 The architect Laurent-Benoît Dewez's stay in Italy from 1754 to 1757;
 The decision in 1774 by the Governor Charles Alexander of Lorraine to redevelop the site of the old palace of Coudenberg, destroyed by fire in 1731 and left in ruins for more forty years, and to entrust the construction area of the Place Royale/Koningsplein and Brussels' Park to two French neoclassical architects, Jean-Benoît-Vincent Barré, who designed the Place Royale and the Church of St. James on Coudenberg, and Gilles-Barnabé Guimard.

Theresian style
The neoclassical style is known as the Louis XVI style in France; however, the parallel development of the style in the Austrian Netherlands is sometimes called "Theresian style" in reference to the Empress Maria Theresa of Austria.

Phases
It is possible to divide the architects and their major works according to the diverse phases of neoclassicism in Belgium and the distinct periods of political occupation.

Pure neoclassicism (1759–1865)

Austrian period (1759–92)
 1759 Laurent-Benoît Dewez
Orval Abbey Church (1759–82, destroyed), Hélécine Abbey (1762–80), Gembloux Abbey (1762–79), Château de Seneffe (1763–68), Abbey of St. Martin of Tournai (1763), Forest Abbey (1764), Church of St. Begga of Andenne (1764–78), Valduc Abbey in Hamme-Mille (1765, destroyed), Bonne-Espérance Abbey in Estinnes (Vellereille-les-Brayeux) (1770–76), Floreffe Abbey interior (1770–75), Sint-Truiden Abbey (1770), Affligem Abbey (1770–79, destroyed), Church of St. Peter in Jette (1776), Vlierbeek Abbey (1776)

 1760 Jean Faulte
Chapel of the Palace of Charles of Lorraine (known as the "Royal Chapel") in Brussels (1760), Sections of the Palace of Charles of Lorraine (1760)

 1766 Jacques-Barthélemy Renoz
Church of the Holy Sacrament in Liège (1766), Waux-hall of Spa (1769–71), Hasselbrouck Castle in Gingelom (Jeuk) (1770), Verviers Town Hall (1775–80), Beaumont Château (1775–76)

 1774 Claude Fisco
Place des Martyrs (1774), Nouveau Marché au Grain in Brussels (1787, with Nivoy)

 1775 Jean-François Wincqz
Church of Cambron Abbey (1775–80), Church of Grand-Leez in Gembloux (1776), Church of St. Peter of Uccle (1782), Church of Neufchâteau-lez-Visé (1789)

 1776 Jean-Benoît Vincent Barré (French architect)
Plans of the Church of St. James on Coudenberg and the Place Royale/Koningsplein in Brussels (1776)

 1776 Gilles-Barnabé Guimard (French architect)
Facade of the Church of St. James on Coudenberg (1776–87), former Hôtel Bellevue, now the BELvue Museum (1776), Place Royale (1776–81), Hôtel de Ligne (1777), Palace of the Nation (now the Belgian Federal Parliament) (1778–83), Hotel Errera (1779–82), all in Brussels

 1779 Charles De Wailly (French architect)
Little theatre of the Château de Seneffe (1779), Royal Palace of Laeken (1782–84), Hunting Lodge Castle d'Ursel (pavilion called "Notelaer") in Hingene (1791–94)

 1782 Louis Montoyer
 Royal Park Theatre in Brussels (1782), Château de Seneffe (1782), supervision of construction of the Royal Palace of Laeken (on plans by Charles de Wailly), former refuge of the Abbey of St. Gertrude of Leuven (1782–84), former Hôtel Walckiers, at 12, rue de la Loi/Wetstraat, in Brussels (1782–84, current Hôtel des Finance), Hôtel Bender, Belgiojoso and Walckiers (1783–86, parts of the Royal Palace of Brussels), choir, nave and transept of the Church of St. James on Coudenberg (1785–86)

 1786 Ghislain-Joseph Henry 
Château de Duras Sint-Truiden (1786–89)

 Anonymous
Porch of St. Margaret's Church of Tournai (1779–82)

French period (1792–1815)
Since the period of French occupation was characterised by the long-running French Revolutionary and Napoleonic Wars, few outstanding neoclassical works were constructed.
 Ghislain Joseph Henry (already active under the Austrian period)
Orangery and temple near Wespelaar (1798)

 1791 L. Radelet
Château de la Tour au Bois in Villers-le-Temple (1791)

 1805 A. Dubois
Château de Sélys-Longchamps in Waremme (1805)

 1806 J.F. Van Gierdegom
Governor's Residence in Bruges (1806)

 1807 J.J. Dutry
Château Gavergracht in Drongen (1807)

Dutch Period (1815–30)
In 1815, the Southern Netherlands were united by the Congress of Vienna with the Dutch United Provinces to form the new Dutch-led United Kingdom of the Netherlands.

Under William I, many of the most significant neoclassical buildings were constructed in Brussels, including the Academy Palace, the Royal Theatre of La Monnaie, the Botanical Gardens, the Royal Observatory and the Royal Palace, precursor of the modern palace.

 Ghislain-Joseph Henry (already active under the Austrian period)
Connection of the Hôtel Bender and Belgiojoso (constructed by Montoyer in 1785) to create the palace of William I in Brussels (1820)

 1815 Charles Vander Straeten
Academy Palace and Royal Stables of Brussels (planned in 1815, built 1823–25), work on the Palace of the Nation (1816–18), Ball room of the Vauxhall of Brussels (after 1820)
(See below for his works after 1830)

 1816 Louis Roelandt
 Aula Academica in Ghent (1816–25), Liberal club of Geraardsbergen (1817), Neoclassical tower of Ninove Abbey (1826–44), south wing of Aalst Town Hall (1828–30)
(See below for his works after 1830)

 1818 Louis Damesme (French architect)
Royal Theatre of La Monnaie in Brussels (1818–19) (not the current building, which was built by Joseph Poelaert), Street surrounding the theatre (designed 1817–19)

 1824 Nicolas Roget (French architect)
Barricades' Square in Brussels (1824), extension of the Palace of Charles of Lorraine (1825), former Royal Observatory of Brussels (1826–32, with Auguste Payen)

 1825 Tilman-François Suys
Completion of the Academy Palace (1825–28), designs of the Botanical Gardens of Brussels (1826, construction started by Pierre-François Gineste, then resumed in 1842 by Suys)
(See below for his works after 1830)

 1825 Bruno Renard
Grand Hornu (1825)
(See below for his works after 1830)

 1826 Pierre Bruno Bourla
Orangery of the Botanical Garden of Antwerp (1826, demolished), French Royal Theatre (known as the "Bourla Theatre") in Antwerp (1827–34)
(See below for his works after 1830)

 1827 Henri Partoes
Pacheco Hospice (1827), Orangery of the Château de Belœil (1830)

Reign of Leopold I (1830–65)

 Architects already active under the United Kingdom of the Netherlands

 Louis Roelandt
Royal Opera of Ghent (1837–40), Hall of the Sint-Truiden Academy (1845)

 Cluysenaar family
Family of famous architects and artists

 Charles Vander Straeten 
Maison de la Malibran (current Ixelles Municipal Hall, 1835)

 Tilman-François Suys
Plans of the Leopold Quarter (1837), extension of the Botanical Gardens of Brussels (1842–54), modification of the Church of St. James on Coudenberg (side-aisles 1843–45, new front to the facade and bell tower 1849–51), Saint Joseph's Church in Brussels (1849), modification of the Palace of the Nation (Senate Chamber, 1847–49)

 Bruno Renard 
St. Peter's Square in Tournai (c. 1850)

 Pierre Bruno Bourla
Museum and entry hall of the Academy of Fine Arts in Antwerp (1841)

 New Architects

 1835 Frans Drossaert
Tienen Town Hall (1835–36)

 1836 Auguste Payen
Former Royal Observatory of Brussels (1826–32, led by Nicolas Roget), Pavilions of the Anderlecht Gate (1832), Pavilions of the Ninove Gate (1832–34), Pavilions of the Namur Gate (1836), Great Lock of Brussels (1840), several railway stations, of which the oldest is the former Brussels-South railway station (1864–69, destroyed)

 1841 Louis Minard
Church of Saint Martin in Melle (1841), Orangery of the horticultural school of Melle, Church of St. Adrien of Adegem (1843–44), Minard Theatre in Ghent (1847)

 1847 J.P.J. Peeters and G. Hansotte
Church of St. John and Nicholas in Schaerbeek (1847–50)

 1849 Joseph Poelaert
Poelaert was an eclectic architect who has some neoclassical achievements to his credit
Extension of Barricades' Square (1849), restoration of La Monnaie theatre following a fire (1855–60)

 1855 Émile Coulon
Church of St. Martin in Quenast (1855), Church of St. Michael in Nivelles (Monstreux) (1859)

Neoclassical Eclecticism (1865–1909)
King Leopold II (1865–1909) was a prodigious builder, who launched various constructions of large buildings to demonstrate the prestige of the monarchy. However, during his reign, the Eclectic style, which appeared with Poelaert under Leopold I, became predominant, mixing various forms from neo-Romanesque, neo-Gothic, neo-Renaissance and neo-Baroque, as well as the neoclassical schools.

Neoclassicism under Leopold II was no exception. Some buildings from this period, such as the Brussels Stock Exchange and the Palace of Justice were openly eclectic; others cited below, can be broadly considered as neoclassical, without exempting them, however, from the banner of characteristic decorative eclecticism.

Note that many of the buildings commissioned by Leopold II incorporated his monogram, consisting of two symmetrical "L" letters.

 1867 Hendrik Beyaert (notable eclectic architect)
Cité Fontainas (with the architect Trappeniers, 1867), work on the Senate building (1883–86)

 1875 Gédéon Bordiau
Design of the Quartier des Squares (1875), work on La Monnaie theatre (1876), Cinquantenaire Palace: colonnades (1880), north and north-eastern halls (1880, now the Royal Museum of the Armed Forces), south-eastern hall, known as the Palace of the People (1888, now Autoworld), extension of the Senate Chamber (1903), all in Brussels

 1892 Charles Thirion
Great Theatre of Verviers (1892)

 1897 Albert-Philippe Aldophe
 in Tervuren (1897)

 1902 Charles Girault (French architect)
Extension of the Royal Palace of Laeken (1902), Arcade du Cinquantenaire (1904), Royal Galleries of Ostend (1905), Royal Museum for Central Africa in Tervuren (1905–10)

 1904 Henri Maquet
Facade of the Royal Palace of Brussels (1904), Royal Military Academy in Brussels (1907, with Henri Van Dievoet)

Late Neoclascissism (1910–80)
In the 20th century, neoclassicism nearly disappeared from the Belgian architectural landscape, swept away by new waves of architectural styles including Art Nouveau (which was very popular in Brussels, see Art Nouveau in Brussels), Art Deco, Modernism and Functionalism.

In Brussels, the survival of the style is owed to the planning laws governing the construction of buildings in the vicinity of Brussels' Park, as well as the desire to preserve the stylistic unity of the neighbourhood.

 1910 François Malfait
Château de la Solitude in Auderghem (1910–12)

 1920 Oscar Van de Voorde
Belgische Bank van de Arbeid in Ghent (1920)

 1930 Michel Polak
Tractebel Headquarters in Brussels (1930)

 1950 André and Jean Polak
"Royal Atrium" at 60–68, rue Royale/Koningsstraat, in Brussels (1950–59)

 1966 Christian Housiaux, Hugo Van Kuyck, Pierre Guillissen
Headquarters of the Société Générale de Belgique at 20–40, rue Royale, in Brussels (1966–80)

 1972–74 Christian et Jean-Pierre Housiaux
Extension of the headquarters of the Union Minière du Haut Katanga at 21, rue du Marais/Broekstraat, in Brussels (1977)

Monumentalist Classical Architecture (1929–59)
During the Interwar period, a style developed in several European countries using neoclassical architecture on a much bigger (monumental) scale.

In the 1930s, this was often associated with totalitarian regimes like Nazi Germany, but the style is often wrongly labeled as Fascist architecture like Stalinist architecture, Nazi architecture or Soft Portuguese style. However, it was also found in democratic countries like Belgium, France (for instance the Palais de Chaillot), Great Britain and the United States.

Postmodernism (after 1980)
At the end of the 20th century, neoclassicism reappeared in a revitalised form incorporated in the Postmodern style. This postmodern neoclassicism is most commonly used in the construction of offices and municipal buildings.

 1989 Ricardo Bofill (Spanish architect)
Headquarters of SWIFT in La Hulpe (1989)

 1989 José Vanden Bossche
"Orion Center" (IWT), at 21-25, boulevard Bischoffsheim/Bischoffsheimlaan, in Brussels (with Fr. Schilling)

 1993 Bureau d'architectes ASSAR
Town square of Auderghem (1993–94)
"Goemaere" ("Thilly Van Eessel I"), at 1945, chaussée de Wavre/Waversesteenweg, in Brussels (1988–98)

 1994 Wolf et Conreur
"Rozendal Business Park", at 6, Terhulpsesteenweg and 2, Albert I-laan, in Hoeilaart)

 1995 Jacques Cuisinier
Hôtel Méridien in Brussels, opposite Brussels Central Station (1995)

 1996 "Roosevelt Business Park", at 104, Avenue Roosevelt, in Genval)

References